The Abner T. Shaw House is a historic mansion in Goodlettsville, Tennessee, U.S. that was built in 1855. It was designed in the Greek Revival architectural style. During the American Civil War of 1861–1865, the house was not burnt down by the Union Army because both Shaw and the Union general were Masons. It has been listed on the National Register of Historic Places since March 28, 1985.

References

Houses on the National Register of Historic Places in Tennessee
Greek Revival houses in Tennessee
Houses completed in 1855
Buildings and structures in Davidson County, Tennessee
Antebellum architecture